Isaac Lodewijk la Fargue van Nieuwland (1726 – 1805), was an 18th-century painter from the Northern Netherlands.

Biography
He was born in The Hague to Jan Thomas la Fargue and was the younger brother of Paulus Constantijn la Fargue.  His other siblings Maria Margaretha, Karel and Jacob Elias also became painters.  In 1768 he became a member of the Confrerie Pictura. He engraved some of the portraits in the Tooneel der uitmuntende schilders van Europa, a dictionary of painters that was illustrated by his brother Paulus Constantijn. Perhaps because of this work, he is known more for portraits than landscapes.
He died in The Hague.

References
	

Isaac Lodewijk la Fargue van Nieuwland on Artnet	
	
	

1726 births
1805 deaths
18th-century Dutch painters
18th-century Dutch male artists
Dutch male painters
Artists from The Hague
Painters from The Hague